Elżbieta Pawlas (born 23 February 1934) is a Polish fencer. She competed at the 1960 and 1968 Summer Olympics.

References

1934 births
Living people
Polish female fencers
Olympic fencers of Poland
Fencers at the 1960 Summer Olympics
Fencers at the 1968 Summer Olympics
Sportspeople from Gdynia
20th-century Polish women